is a city located in Ishikawa Prefecture, Japan. , the city had an estimated population of 27,698 in 12768 households, and a population density of 65 persons per km².

Geography 
Wajima occupies the northwestern coast of Noto Peninsula and is bordered by the Sea of Japan on the north and west. Parts of the city are within the borders of the Noto Hantō Quasi-National Park. The island of Hegurajima, located 47 kilometers from the north coast of Noto Peninsula is administratively part of the city of Wajima.

Neighbouring municipalities 
Ishikawa Prefecture:
Suzu,
Noto,
Shika, and
Anamizu.

Climate 
Wajima has a humid continental climate (Köppen Cfa) characterized by mild summers and cold winters with heavy snowfall.

Demographics
Per Japanese census data, the population of Wajima has declined by roughly 50 percent over the past 50 years.

History 
The area around Wajima was part of ancient Noto Province, and was a noted seaport for trade with the Asian continent. During the Sengoku Period (1467–1568), the area was contested between the Hatakeyama clan, Uesugi clan and Maeda clan, with the area becoming part of Kaga Domain under the Edo period Tokugawa shogunate.  It remained a noted seaport for the Kitamaebune coastal trade between Osaka and Hokkaido.

Following the Meiji restoration, the area was organised into Hōsu and Fugeshi districts. The town of Wajima was established with the creation of the modern municipalities system on April 1, 1889. It was raised to city status on March 31, 1954 after merging with the neighbouring villages of Oya, Kawarada, Konosu, Nishiho, Mii, and Najimi. On February 1, 2006, the town of Monzen was merged into Wajima.

On March 25, 2007, the 2007 Noto earthquake caused one death, 279-356 injuries (26 of them seriously), and damage to property in Wajima and other parts of Ishikawa Prefecture. Around 6,056 houses were affected by the quake, 476 of them were completely destroyed.

Government 
Wajima has a mayor-council form of government with a directly-elected mayor and a unicameral city legislature of 20 members.

Economy 
Commercial fishing, tourism, agriculture and the production of lacquerware are mainstays of the local economy.

Education 
Wajima has ten public elementary schools and three middle schools operated by the city government, and two public high school operated by the Ishikawa Prefectural Board of Education. There is also one private high school.

Transportation 
Noto Airport is located here.
The city does not have any passenger railway service.
Highway  goes through this city.

Local attractions

Wajima Lacquerware 
The town is known in Japan for its lacquerware, called Wajima-nuri. There are artifacts showing lacquer was used to decorate and strengthen a shrine door from the 14th century. Wajima-nuri uses a technique that is unique to the area, mixing a finely powdered mineral, with the lacquer in the early stages of production for extra durability. The rougher, earlier layers are then coated with more layers of finer lacquer, which is polished to a lustrous shine and often decorated with designs made of gold and other precious materials. The lacquer tree was once abundant in the area but is now scarce and most of the lacquer used is imported from China.

Wajima Morning Market 

The Wajima Morning Market is open every day except the 2nd Wednesday and 4th Wednesday of each month (and January 1–3 every year). Operating hours are from 8:00 AM to noon. Visitors can stroll through the many stalls of fresh seafood, lacquerware, and other handicrafts.

1000 Rice Fields 
"1000 Rice Fields") is one of the most scenic places in Ishikawa. There are actually 1004 fields which are either owned and tended by families, or rented out and looked after by the locals. Each year during the last week of September, the names of two couples are drawn as part of a nationwide lottery to have their wedding ceremony at Senmaida. The event is open to the public.

As a memorial to the Noto earthquake, a tradition of lighting the fields began. Initially this was done with millions of candles placed around each field following the harvest. Due to the popularity of the spectacle, solar LED lanterns are now used allowing the fields to be lit nightly. The lanterns are installed at the end of September and are left up through March when work on the fields begins again. The fields remain lit for about four hours after sunset.

Kiriko Museum 
Wajima's museum of  lanterns is open every day of the year from 8:00am to 5:00pm (8:30am to 4:00pm from December to February).  are large paper lanterns traditional to the area.

Wajima Taisai 
Visitors can watch huge ( tall)  lanterns and smaller paper lanterns being carried through the streets along with portable shrines called . Visitors can eat festival foods, listen to taiko drums being played, and watch the main event. At the festival climax, seaside stacks of bamboo poles are torched as bonfires, some four or five stories high. (decorative strips of white paper used in Shinto rituals) is tied to the bamboo. As the fire consumes the poles, competing groups of men struggle to pull down the blazing piles, claiming as their prize pieces of burnt bamboo along with the  attached as symbols of good fortune. Victors then climb to the top of their respective  to hang their prize, purportedly to add to the good fortune of their village in the coming year.

The giant  lanterns are indispensable to festivals celebrated in Noto. Wajima's festival  are especially distinctive because of their Wajima lacquer coatings. The lanterns bear the inscription of a three-character kanji poem and, on the reverse side, the crest of the village where the  originate.

Once a year the people of Noto guide the male  from his forest home through the city, while stopping at every business, home, and shrine to give blessings to the people of Wajima, and eventually to meet his wife at the sea.

The main event takes place on the third night of the festival at midnight at Wajima Marine Park.

Gojinjo-daiko 

 is a Japanese drumming style, which is elected as a Wajima City's cultural heritage (appointed in 1961) and an Ishikawa Prefecture's intangible cultural heritage (appointed in 1963), consisting a part of Noto, Ishikawa’s GIAHS (Globally Important Agricultural Heritage Systems), which was appointed in 2011 as the first area in Japan by Food and Agriculture Organization.

Playing gojinjo-daiko is strictly restricted to residents in Nafune, a small village within Wajima, where only 250 people live. It is very rare to see a live drum performance.

The origin of the gojinjo-daiko dates back to 1577 when the famous general, Uesugi Kenshin invaded Noto. Because local people had no weapons, they resisted by beating war drums and wore ferocious looking devil masks with seaweed on their heads to scare off their enemies. The low sound of drums sound associated with the rumbling of the earth frightened off the invaders.

Wajima Crab Festival 
The Wajima Crab Festival takes place each year in mid-November. Visitors can purchase fresh seafood and sit at one of many large, long tables and barbecue their own meal.

Kamakura Light Festival 
Kamakura is in the northern part of the Noto Peninsula. It is a small, peaceful village with ancient temples and rice terraces. It celebrates an annual light festival in which the residents place one candle in each of 20,000 glass sake cups and arrange them in geometric configurations after dark while listening to traditional Japanese music. The event is held on August 16.

References

Further reading

External links 

 

 
Cities in Ishikawa Prefecture
Populated coastal places in Japan